The  was an army of the Imperial Japanese Army initially based in Manchukuo as a garrison force under the overall command of the Kwantung Army. At the end of World War II it was active in east China.

History
The Japanese 6th Army was initially raised on August 4, 1939 in Manchukuo as a garrison force to guard the western borders against possible incursions by the Soviet Red Army. It was a major participant in the Nomonhan Incident, during which time it took severe casualties. Afterwards, it was initially assigned to Hailar, in Inner Mongolia which was also the site of an extensive Japanese static military fortification system. During much of the Second Sino-Japanese War, it remained a reserve and training garrison force.

On January 26, 1945, the Japanese Sixth Army was reassigned to the control of the China Expeditionary Army, and was sent south to bolster Japanese forces in the strategic Wuhan-Changsha front, filling the gap left by the departure of Japanese forces in the southward Operation Ichi-Go thrust. At the surrender of Japan, it was disbanded at Hangzhou, Zhejiang province, China.

List of commanders

Commanding officer

Chief of Staff

References

External links

06
Military units and formations established in 1939
Military units and formations disestablished in 1945